The 1972 Oakland Athletics season involved the A's winning the American League West with a record of 93 wins and 62 losses. In the playoffs, they defeated the Detroit Tigers in a five-game ALCS, followed by a seven-game World Series, in which they defeated the Cincinnati Reds for their sixth overall World Championship and first since 1930, when the club was in Philadelphia.

Offseason 
 November 29, 1971: Rick Monday was traded by the Athletics to the Chicago Cubs for Ken Holtzman.
 November 29, 1971: 1971 rule 5 draft
Brant Alyea was drafted by the Athletics from the Minnesota Twins.
Steve Hovley was drafted from the Athletics by the Kansas City Royals.
 January 12, 1972: 1972 Major League Baseball Draft (January Draft) notable picks:
Round 9: Rich Dauer (did not sign)
Round 10: Bob Lacey 
 March 4, 1972: Jim Panther and Don Stanhouse were traded by the Athletics to the Texas Rangers for Denny McLain.

Regular season 
In 1972, the A's began wearing solid green or solid gold jerseys, with contrasting white pants, at a time when most other teams wore all-white uniforms at home and all-grey ones on the road. Similar to more colorful amateur softball uniforms, they were considered a radical departure for their time.

Furthermore, in conjunction with a Moustache Day promotion, Finley offered $300 to any player who grew a moustache by Father's Day, at a time when every other team traditionally forbade facial hair. When Father's Day arrived on Sunday, June 18, every player on the 25-man roster collected a bonus.

Changing the nickname 
The nickname "A's" has long been used interchangeably with "Athletics", dating to the team's early days when headline writers wanted a way to shorten the name. Starting in 1972, the team nickname was officially "Oakland A's." The Commissioner's Trophy, given out annually to the winner of baseball's World Series, still listed the team's name as the "Oakland Athletics" on the gold-plated pennant representing the Oakland franchise. According to Bill Libby's Book, Charlie O and the Angry A's, owner Charlie O. Finley banned the word "Athletics" from the club's name because he felt that name was too closely associated with former Philadelphia Athletics owner Connie Mack, and he wanted the name "Oakland A's" to become just as closely associated with himself. The name also vaguely suggested the name of the old minor league Oakland Oaks, which were alternatively called the "Acorns".

Season standings

Record vs. opponents

Opening Day Lineup

Notable transactions 
 April 15, 1972: Tim Cullen was signed as a free agent by the Athletics.
 May 15, 1972: Dwain Anderson was traded by the Athletics to the St. Louis Cardinals for Don Shaw.
 May 17, 1972: Curt Blefary, Mike Kilkenny, and a player to be named later were traded by the Athletics to the San Diego Padres for Ollie Brown. The Athletics completed the trade by sending Greg Schubert (minors) to the Padres on September 11.
 May 18, 1972: Brant Alyea was traded by the Athletics to the St. Louis Cardinals for Marty Martínez.
 June 6, 1972: 1972 Major League Baseball Draft (June Draft) notable picks:
Round 1: Chet Lemon
Round 9: Dennis Littlejohn (did not sign)
Round 12: Chris Batton
Round 15: Bob Pate (did not play)
 June 7, 1972: Diego Seguí was sent by the Athletics to the St. Louis Cardinals as part of a conditional deal.
 June 29, 1972: Denny McLain was traded by the Athletics to the Atlanta Braves for Orlando Cepeda.
 July 20, 1972: Marty Martínez, Vic Harris and a player to be named later were traded by the Athletics to the Texas Rangers for Don Mincher and Ted Kubiak. The Athletics completed the deal by sending Steve Lawson to the Rangers on July 26.
 July 23, 1972: Brant Alyea was returned to the Athletics by the St. Louis Cardinals.
 August 30, 1972: Joe Lindsey (minors) and a player to be named later were traded by the Athletics to the St. Louis Cardinals for Dal Maxvill. The Athletics completed the trade by sending Gene Dusen (minors) to the Cardinals on October 27.

Roster

Player stats

Batting

Starters by position 
Note: Pos = Position; G = Games played; AB = At bats; H = Hits; Avg. = Batting average; HR = Home runs; RBI = Runs batted in

Other batters 
Note: G = Games played; AB = At bats; H = Hits; Avg. = Batting average; HR = Home runs; RBI = Runs batted in

Pitching

Starting pitchers 
Note: G = Games pitched; IP = Innings pitched; W = Wins; L = Losses; ERA = Earned run average; SO = Strikeouts

Other pitchers 
Note: G = Games pitched; IP = Innings pitched; W = Wins; L = Losses; ERA = Earned run average; SO = Strikeouts

Relief pitchers 
Note: G = Games pitched; W = Wins; L = Losses; SV = Saves; ERA = Earned run average; SO = Strikeouts

Postseason

ALCS

Game 1 
October 7, 1972, at Oakland-Alameda County Coliseum

Game 2 
October 8, 1972, at Oakland-Alameda County Coliseum

Game 3 
October 10, 1972, at Tiger Stadium

Game 4 
October 11, 1972, at Tiger Stadium

Game 5 
October 12, 1972, at Tiger Stadium

World Series 

In 1972, the A's won their first league pennant since 1931 and faced the Cincinnati Reds in the World Series. The A's seven-game victory over the heavily favored Reds gave the team its first World Series Championship since 1930.

Of the four wins against the Reds, three of them occurred in Cincinnati, and all four Series victories were by a single run. Gene Tenace hit four home runs and drove in nine runs to power the A's offense, and was named the series Most Valuable Player.

Composite Box 
1972 World Series (4–3): Oakland Athletics (A.L.) over Cincinnati Reds (N.L.)

Awards and honors 
 Gene Tenace, Babe Ruth Award
 Gene Tenace, World Series Most Valuable Player

League leaders 
 Joe Rudi, American League leader, triples (tied) (9)

Farm system

References

External links

1972 Oakland Athletics team page at Baseball Reference
1972 Oakland Athletics team page at www.baseball-almanac.com

Oakland Athletics seasons
Oakland Athletics seaspm
American League West champion seasons
American League champion seasons
World Series champion seasons
Oakland Athletics season